John Bennett (fl. 1586–1589) was an English politician.

He was a Member (MP) of the Parliament of England for Heytesbury in 1586 and Westbury in 1589.

References

Year of birth missing
Year of death missing
English MPs 1586–1587
English MPs 1589